This is an episode list for Cartoon Planet listed from its re-packaged season of 22 half-hour episodes that aired from 1997 to 1998 (followed by two specials episodes), along with the episode listings of the 2012 revival series.

Series overview

Season 1 (1997–98) 
 This season consists of 22 overall episodes which are made up of the skits from the original hour-long series minus the featuring of segments from cartoon shows.
 This season is hosted by Space Ghost, Brak, and Zorak.

Season 2 (2012) 
This season returns the show to its original one-hour format and also features episode segments from various cartoon shows. Instead of classic 1960s-era cartoons being showcased like the original format, this show now features Cartoon Network's earlier original cartoons, such as Dexter's Laboratory, The Powerpuff Girls, Johnny Bravo, and many more. Each show usually features either four 11-minute episodes, or three 7-minute episodes and two 11-minute episodes.

This season features the return of Brak and Zorak hosting, without Space Ghost, although in a skit for episode 25, a tiny clone of Space Ghost can be found on Brak's coffee mug.

The opening sequences of the Cartoon Network cartoons have been cut-short as of the 2010s.

Season 3 (2013–14) 

Cartoon Network